Mynes geoffroyi, the Jezebel nymph, is a medium-sized butterfly of the family Nymphalidae found in Australia. The subspecies M. g. guerini is called the white nymph.

References

External links

Nymphalini
Butterflies of Australia
Butterflies described in 1830